The  is a railway line in Osaka Prefecture and Wakayama Prefecture, Japan, owned and operated by the Nankai Electric Railway, a private railway operator. It connects Osaka and Koyasan, the capital of the Japanese Buddhist sect Shingon, via the suburbs of Osaka, such as Sakai, Osakasayama, Tondabayashi and Kawachinagano in Osaka Prefecture and Hashimoto and Kōya in Wakayama Prefecture. To distinguish it from other Nankai Lines, the Kōya Line is indicated with pictograms of coniferous-like trees which bring to mind Mount Kōya, or with the line colour, green.

For historical reasons, the line formally begins at Shiomibashi Station in Osaka and crosses the Nankai Main Line, the company's other main line, at Kishinosato-Tamade Station, though operationally it starts at Namba Station together with the Nankai Line, diverges at Kishinosato-Tamade Station and goes to Gokurakubashi Station, to connect to Koyasan through Nankai Cable Line.

Service patterns

Between Namba and Sakaihigashi, Kitanoda, Kongō, Chiyoda, Kawachinagano, Miikkaichichō, Rinkanden-entoshi or Hashimoto, and between Hashimoto and Kōyashita or Gokurakubashi.

All the southbound trains are operated from Namba to Izumi-Chūō on the Semboku Rapid Railway Line. On weekday mornings, northbound trains for Namba are operated from Kawachinagano and Chiyoda in addition to the through trains from the Semboku Rapid Railway Line.

Trains are operated between Namba and Kawachinagano, Miikkaichichō, Rinkanden-entoshi or Izumi-Chūō (Semboku Line).

Trains are operated mainly between Namba and Miikkaichichō, Rinkanden-entoshi or Hashimoto. Several trains are operated between Namba and Kōyashita or Gokurakubashi.

All trains are operated between Namba and Gokurakubashi, and use a special "Zoomcar" rolling stock. On weekday evenings, southbound trains for Hashimoto from Namba are operated using other rolling stock.

From December 5, 2015,  services also commenced between Namba and Izumi-Chūō (Semboku Line). All seats on Limited Express trains are reserved.

From July 3, 2009, trains operate between Hashimoto and Gokurakubashi daily except Wednesdays and Thursdays from March until November, and on Saturdays, Sundays and national holidays from December until February. They stop at Kamuro and Kudoyama.

For fare calculation, the distance between Tengachaya and Tezukayama is defined as 1.8 km

Stations

Namba - Kishinosato-Tamade - Gokurakubashi
Legends:

 ● : All trains stop.
 ｜: All trains pass.
 ◆ : Extra Limited Express trains originating at Hashimoto stop here
▲  - Semboku Liner No Stop

Shiomibashi - Kishinosato-Tamade

History
The Koya Railway opened the Shiomibashi to Sayama section between 1898 and 1900, and extended the line to Kawachinagano in 1902. That section was electrified at 600 V DC in 1912. All further extensions were electrified when opened.

The Kawachinagano - Mikkaichicho section opened in 1914, and the line was extended to Hashimoto the following year. In 1922, the company merged with Nankai, and the Hashimoto to Gokurakubashi section opened in 1929.

Double-tracking of the line commenced in 1924, reaching Kawachinagano in 1938. The line voltage was increased to 1,500 V DC in 1973, and the following year, double-tracking reached Mikkaichicho, and Hashimoto in 1995.

References

Koya Line
Rail transport in Osaka Prefecture
Rail transport in Wakayama Prefecture
1067 mm gauge railways in Japan